Elena Likhovtseva and Anastasia Myskina were the defending champions, but neither chose to participate that year.

Liezel Huber and Sania Mirza won the title, defeating Yuliya Beygelzimer and Yuliana Fedak 6–4, 6–0 in the final.

Seeds

Results

Draw

Qualifying

Seeds

  Geeta Manohar /  Sonal Phadke (qualifying competition)
  Isha Lakhani /  Sandhya Nagaraj (qualified)

Qualifiers
  Isha Lakhani /  Sandhya Nagaraj

Draw

References

External links
Doubles Draw

2006 WTA Tour
Sunfeast Open